Michael Hazen James McIntyre (born 21 February 1976) is an English comedian, writer, and television presenter. In 2012, he was the highest-grossing stand-up comedian in the world. He currently presents his own Saturday night series, Michael McIntyre's Big Show, and the game show, The Wheel, on BBC One. He also hosts the US version on NBC.

In addition to stand-up comedy, McIntyre has hosted his own BBC One comedy programme Michael McIntyre's Comedy Roadshow, has featured in three episodes of Live at the Apollo, and in 2011 was a judge on Britain's Got Talent.

Early life
Born in London to Thomas Cameron McIntyre, known as Ray Cameron, a Canadian comedian and comedy writer in British television, and his wife Kati, Michael McIntyre grew up in the industry. He has a sister, Lucy. McIntyre is a dual British-Canadian citizen, by virtue of his father. At the age of seventeen, Michael had been told that his father died from a heart attack; years later, his stepmother, Holly revealed that Ray had died by suicide while in Hollywood. His mother, Kati, is of Hungarian Jewish ancestry.

Career

Television

McIntyre has appeared three times on BBC One's Live at the Apollo, in 2007, 2008 and 2009. He has released four DVDs, Live and Laughing, Hello Wembley, Showtime and Happy and Glorious, which have sold a combined total of over five million copies in the UK.

McIntyre's many comedy panel show and chat show appearances include Chris Moyles' Quiz Night, Mock the Week, 8 out of 10 Cats, Have I Got News for You, The Big Fat Quiz of the Year, Would I Lie To You?, The Apprentice: You're Fired!, Alan Carr: Chatty Man and Friday Night with Jonathan Ross.

From 6 June 2009, McIntyre began hosting Michael McIntyre's Comedy Roadshow, which aired Saturday nights on BBC One. On 5 July 2009, McIntyre appeared on the BBC show Top Gear as the "star in a reasonably priced car", driving around the Top Gear test track in one minute and 48.7 seconds. During his lap of the track he almost rolled the car while going around the final corner, but his hair was kempt.

On 31 March 2010, McIntyre took part in Channel 4's Comedy Gala, a benefit show held in aid of Great Ormond Street Hospital, filmed live at London's O2 Arena. He also appeared on the year's edition of The Big Fat Quiz of the Year on Channel 4, where he was partnered with Alan Carr.

On 14 December 2010, it was announced that McIntyre would join the ITV talent show Britain's Got Talent as a judge in 2011 with David Hasselhoff and Amanda Holden. McIntyre and Hasselhoff replaced Piers Morgan and Simon Cowell, although Cowell returned for the live shows and Hasselhoff was only the additional fourth judge. After only one series, McIntyre was replaced by Alesha Dixon.

In 2010 and 2014, McIntyre hosted the Royal Variety Performance on ITV. He also previously performed on the show twice: in 2006 and 2008.

McIntyre co-hosted various segments of Comic Relief in 2011 and 2013 on BBC One. On Christmas Day 2011, he hosted a Christmas Special edition of Michael McIntyre's Comedy Roadshow. The show was watched by 8.1 million viewers.

In 2014 McIntyre fronted his own BBC One talk programme, The Michael McIntyre Chat Show. A Christmas special aired on Christmas Day in 2014. On 5 April 2015, he presented Michael McIntyre Presents...Easter Night at the Coliseum, a one-off special for BBC One.

In November 2015, it was announced that McIntyre would return to BBC One for Michael McIntyre's Big Christmas Show. The show was recorded in front of a live audience in the Theatre Royal in London before airing on Christmas Day.

Since April 2016, McIntyre has presented Michael McIntyre's Big Show, a Saturday night entertainment series for BBC One. A second series began airing in November 2016. A third series began airing in November 2017.

In November 2020, McIntyre began hosting a new BBC gameshow entitled The Wheel. In August 2021, it was announced that McIntyre would host a U.S. version of The Wheel on NBC, which premiered on December 19, 2022.

Stage
McIntyre has performed three times on the Royal Variety Performance, including in 2010 when he became the youngest-ever host. In 2009, he performed for an estimated total of 500,000 people on his first tour of the United Kingdom that included a record-breaking six nights at Wembley Arena and four at The O2 Arena.

In 2012, his UK tour included 71 arena dates, playing to over 700,000 people, including a record-breaking 10 nights at the O2 Arena in London. According to ticket sales company Pollstar, the tour helped make McIntyre the world's biggest selling comedian in 2012, bringing in around £21m. On 20 April 2013 McIntyre played the biggest comedy gig in Africa to 9,000 fans at the Coca-Cola Dome in Johannesburg.

In 2015, McIntyre toured the UK and Ireland with his "Happy & Glorious" tour. In February 2016, he and the tour went to Norway for two dates, and in October 2016 he took it to Australia for four dates. In 2018 he became the highest selling artist in the history of the O2 Arena, selling over 400,000 tickets over 28 shows, which surpassed the previous record held by Take That.

Radio
McIntyre's radio appearances have included:
Does the Team Think? (BBC Radio 2)
Heresy, 4 Stands Up, Happy Mondays, The Unbelievable Truth (all on BBC Radio 4)

The Jon Richardson Show (BBC 6 Music)
The Jonathan Ross Show (BBC Radio 2)
The Chris Moyles Show (BBC Radio 1)
Desert Island Discs (BBC Radio 4)

Books
In 2010, McIntyre released his autobiography, Life  and Laughing: My Story.

In 2021, he released the second part of his memoirs, A Funny Life, detailing his life after his debut at the 2006 Royal Variety Performance (his previous book concluded with the event).

Personal life
McIntyre lives in Hampstead, London with his aromatherapist wife, Kitty, who is a daughter of actor Simon Ward and sister of actress Sophie Ward. The couple have two sons, Lucas and Oscar.

McIntyre is a supporter of Tottenham Hotspur. McIntyre is also a keen cricket fan and has appeared on Test Match Special to discuss the sport.

On 4 June 2018, McIntyre was robbed of a watch by men on mopeds while he was parked outside his children's school.

Filmography

Stand-up

Tours

Awards

References

External links

 Official website
 

1976 births
21st-century English comedians
Living people
Best Entertainment Performance BAFTA Award (television) winners
Edinburgh Comedy Festival
English stand-up comedians
British people of Canadian descent
English people of Canadian descent 
English people of Hungarian descent
British people of Hungarian-Jewish descent
People educated at Arnold House School
People educated at Merchant Taylors' School, Northwood
People from the London Borough of Merton
Alumni of the University of Edinburgh
English television talk show hosts